Richard Crispin Thoenen (born January 9, 1944) is a former Major League Baseball pitcher who appeared for the Philadelphia Phillies in one game during its 1967 season.

External links

1944 births
Living people
Bakersfield Bears players
Baseball players from Missouri
Chattanooga Lookouts players
Eugene Emeralds players
Florida Instructional League Phillies players
Industriales de Valencia players
Macon Peaches players
Major League Baseball pitchers
Notre Dame Fighting Irish baseball players
People from Mexico, Missouri
Philadelphia Phillies players
San Diego Padres (minor league) players
Spartanburg Phillies players